Boʻston is an urban-type settlement in the Jizzakh Region, Uzbekistan. It is part of Zarbdor District. The town population in 1989 was 5,684.

References

Populated places in Jizzakh Region
Urban-type settlements in Uzbekistan